1923 in philosophy

Publications 
 George Santayana, Scepticism and Animal Faith (1923)
 John Cowper Powys, Psychoanalysis and Morality (1923)
 Ernst Cassirer, Philosophy of Symbolic Forms (1923)
 Martin Buber, I and Thou (1923)
 György Lukács, History and Class Consciousness (1923)
 Walter Benjamin, The Task of the Translator (1923)
 I. A. Richards, The Meaning of Meaning (1923)

Births 
 January 8 – Joseph Weizenbaum (died 2008)
 January 11 – Ernst Nolte (died 2016)
 February 9 – André Gorz (died 2007)
 May 29 – Eduardo Lourenço 
 June 3 – Wolfgang Stegmüller (died 1991)
 December 29 – Cheikh Anta Diop (died 1986)

Deaths 
 February 1 – Ernst Troeltsch (born 1865)
 June 29 – Fritz Mauthner (born 1849)
 August 19 – Vilfredo Pareto (born 1848)

Philosophy
20th-century philosophy
Philosophy by year